The 3rd/9th Light Horse (South Australian Mounted Rifles) (3/9 SAMR) is a Reserve light cavalry regiment of the Australian Army based in Smithfield, South Australia. Part of the Royal Australian Armoured Corps (RAAC), the regiment is attached to the 9th Brigade, 2nd Division and currently operates G-Wagon SRV 6x6 and Bushmaster Protected Mobility Vehicles. On 26 October 2022, 9th Brigade transitioned as a Direct Command to Forces Command (FORCOMD) as part of an Army wide transformation. 3rd/9th Light Horse (South Australian Mounted Rifles), 1st Armoured Regiment officially commenced on 1 November 2022.

History
In 1948, following the completion of the demobilisation process after the end of the Second World War, the Citizens Military Force—Australia's part-time volunteer army—was reformed, albeit on a reduced scale. At this time, the 3rd/9th Light Horse (South Australian Mounted Rifles) was formed in Adelaide in order to perpetuate four previously existing South Australian light horse regiments, the 3rd, 9th, 18th and 23rd Light Horse Regiments.

These units trace their lineage back to a volunteer cavalry unit formed in Adelaide in 1840. A 28-strong detachment from the militia unit was sent to London to represent the colony at the 1897 celebrations in honor of the Diamond jubilee of Queen Victoria, under the command of Lieutenant Colonel James Rowell. After contributing personnel to fight in the Second Boer War as part of the South Australian Bushman's Contingent, over time this unit was expanded into two regiments, the 16th and 17th Light Horse Regiments which were again re-organised upon the outbreak of the First World War to form the 3rd and 9th Light Horse Regiments. During the war, these two regiments fought at Gallipoli as dismounted infantry, before taking part in the Sinai and Palestine campaign during which the 9th Light Horse had the honour of being the only Australian unit to capture an enemy unit's battle standard, capturing the Turkish 46th Regiment's standard in 1918.

3/9 LH SAMR is also historical custodian for the 2/9th Armoured Regiment and carries their battle honours on the Guidon of the 9th LHR. The 2/9th Armoured Regiment was raised in August 1941, as part of the 1st Armoured Division's 2nd Armoured Brigade. The 2/9th was to take part in the Operation Oboe Six operations, a series of amphibious landings designed to reoccupy areas of the Borneo and the Netherlands East Indies. The regiment would support the 9th Division landings at Tarakan, and then Labuan and Brunei Bay, in British North Borneo.The 2/9th Armoured Regiment remained on Borneo until the end of December, when it returned to Australia and was disbanded at the start of 1946.

Upon re-establishment in 1948 they adopted the Staghound armoured car, which it operated until 1956. At this time, the Australian Army, following the British Army's lead, decided that armoured units would be tasked with anti-tank defence. As a result of this, the regiment was converted to an anti-tank regiment, equipped with Land Rover four wheel drives and 6-pounder static and towed 17-pounder anti-tank guns. This was only short-lived, however. In 1957, amidst widescale cutbacks in the RAAC, the regiment was close to disbandment. In order to save it from extinction, it was converted to an armoured reinforcement group, however, it never trained in this role and in 1960, when the Army adopted the Pentropic organisation, it reverted to the anti-tank role.

After the abandonment of the Pentropic organisation in 1965, the regiment converted to the cavalry role, equipped with Staghounds, Ferret scout cars and Saracen armoured personnel carriers.

In 1976 the regiment was reduced to a Squadron and was equipped with the M113 Armoured Personnel Carrier, which it operated in the armoured reconnaissance role.

In 2006, the regiment converted from the armoured personnel carrier to the light cavalry role; in doing so it handed back its M113 APCs and began operating Land Rover four and six wheel drives. It then transitioned to operate the Protected Mobility Vehicle - Medium (Bushmaster) whilst converting again to dismounted Cavalry Operations.

On 1 November 2022, 3rd/9th Light Horse (South Australian Mounted Rifles) transferred its direct command to Regimental Headquarters, 1st Armoured Regiment and is now the sixth Squadron in that Armoured Cavalry Regiment (ACR).

Battle honours
The 3rd/9th Light Horse (South Australian Mounted Rifles) perpetuates the following battle honours from its predecessor units:
 Boer War: South Africa 1899–1902;
 First World War: Defence of Anzac, Sari Bair, Gallipoli 1915, Romani, Magdhaba–Rafah, Gaza–Beersheba, Jerusalem, Jaffa, Jordan (Es Salt),  Jericho, Meggido, Jordan (Amman), Sharon and Damascus.
 Second World War: South-West Pacific 1945, Tarakan, Labuan.

Alliances
 – Royal Dragoon Guards;
 – Queen's Royal Hussars.

See also
South Australian Mounted Rifles – South Australian contingent to Boer War 1899–1900

Notes

References
 
 

Armoured and cavalry regiments of the Australian Army
Military units and formations established in 1948
Mounted regiments of Australia
Military units in South Australia